The Racquetball competition at the 2010 Central American and Caribbean Games was held in Mayagüez, Puerto Rico. 

The tournament was held from 20–26 July at the RUM Racquetball Courts in Mayagüez.

Medal summary

Men's events

Women's events

Medals table

Result Summaries

Men's singles

Men's doubles

Women's singles

Women's doubles

References

External links

Events at the 2010 Central American and Caribbean Games
2010
2010 in racquetball
July 2010 sports events in North America
Racquetball in Puerto Rico
Racquetball at multi-sport events